Malgassesia is a genus of moths in the family Sesiidae.

Species
Malgassesia ankaratralis  Viette, 1957
Malgassesia biedermanni  Viette, 1982
Malgassesia milloti  Viette, 1982
Malgassesia pauliani  Viette, [1955]
Malgassesia rufescens  Le Cerf, 1922
Malgassesia rufithorax (Le Cerf, 1922)
Malgassesia seyrigi  Viette, [1955]

References

Sesiidae